Ramchandra Vidyabagish (1786 – 2 March 1845) was an Indian lexicographer and Sanskrit scholar. His Bangabhashabhidhan, the first monolingual Bengali dictionary, was published in 1817. He taught at the Vedanta College established by Raja Rammohun Roy, and later at Sanskrit College from 1827-37. Closely associated with the work of Raja Rammohun Roy in Kolkata, he was the first secretary of the Brahmo Sabha established in 1828 and initiated Debendranath Tagore and 21 other young men into Brahmo Samaj in 1843.

References
 Sengupta, Subodh Chandra and Anjali Bose (1988) (ed.) Sansad Bangali Charitabhidhan (Biographical dictionary) (in Bengali), Calcutta: Sahitya Sansad, p. 472.

Brahmos
Hindu revivalists
1786 births
1845 deaths
Bengali Hindus
19th-century Bengalis
Bengali educators
Bengali-language writers
Indian writers
18th-century Indian writers
19th-century Indian writers
Educators from West Bengal
Indian educators
Educationists from India
19th-century Indian educators
18th-century Indian educators
Indian male writers
19th-century Indian male writers
Sanskrit scholars from Bengal
Indian lexicographers